Marcel Paul Roger Fournier called Paul Marcelles, (16 November 1863 – 25 May 1947) was a French composer of songs, theatre music and ballet.

Life 
Fournier was born in Paris. A student of the École Centrale Paris and, for music, of André Gedalge, he is credited with numerous pantomimes, song scores, and works for the stage. He made a name for himself in 1891 with Pierrette Doctoresse, a one-act pantomime by Gaston Guérin.

Work 
 1891: Pierrette Doctoresse, pantomime en 1 acte, de Gaston Guérin: Cercle Mathurins
 1891: Ludus pro patria, one act pantomime, by Henry Gerbault and Henri Arthus : Bodinière, 15 December
 1891: Veuve Prosper, successeur, operetta in 3 acts, by Adrien Vély and Alévy : Théâtre Déjazet
 1894: Une bonne soirée, One act comedy by Adrien Vély and Alévy, music by Paul Marcelles : Théâtre de l'Ambigu
 1898: L'Enlèvement des Sabines, ballet-pantomime by Adrien Vély and Charles Dutreil, music by Paul Marcelles : Folies-Bergère, (September 1898)
 1899: Les Babylones, lyrical prophecy in 23 scenes by Adrien Vély, music by Paul Marcelles
 1901: La Danse à travers les âges !, rondeau, lyrics by Marcel de Germiny, music by Marcel Fournier (Paul Marcelles) 
 1902: Le Minotaure, three acts operetta, lyrics by Charles Clairville and Adrien Vély, music by Paul Marcelles
 1903: Le Prince consort, fantasy comedy in 3 acts by Léon Xanrof and Jules Chancel, music by Paul Marcelles
 1904: Deux Fables by Miguel Zamacoïs, set in music by Paul Marcelles
 1907: Au drapeau, national epic in sixteen scenes, words by Gaston Guérin, shadow theatre by 
 1907: Les Babylones, prophétie lyrique by Adrien Vély, music by M. Paul Marcelles
 undated: Pour la Patrie, shadow theatre, music by Paul Marcelles, lyrics by Amédée Vignola

References

Further reading 
 Jules Martin, Nos auteurs et compositeurs dramatiques, 1897, 
 Charles Bergmans, La musique et les musiciens, 1902, 
 Enciclopedia Espasa, vol. 32, 1905, 
 Pierre Larousse, Nouveau Larousse illustré ; supplément, 1906,

External links 

French composers
1863 births
1947 deaths
Musicians from Paris